The blue-gray tanager (Thraupis episcopus) is a medium-sized South American songbird of the tanager family, Thraupidae. Its range is from Mexico south to northeast Bolivia and northern Brazil, all of the Amazon Basin, except the very south. It has been introduced to Lima (Peru). On Trinidad and Tobago, this bird is called blue jean.

Taxonomy
In 1760 the French zoologist Mathurin Jacques Brisson included a description of the blue-grey tanager in his Ornithologie based on a specimen collected in Brazil. He used the French name L'evesque and the Latin name Episcopus avis. Although Brisson coined Latin names, these do not conform to the binomial system and are not recognised by the International Commission on Zoological Nomenclature. When in 1766 the Swedish naturalist Carl Linnaeus updated his Systema Naturae for the twelfth edition he added 240 species that had been previously described by Brisson in his Ornithologie. One of these was the fulvous-crested tanager. Linnaeus included a terse description, coined the binomial name Tanagra episcopus and cited Brisson's work. The specific name episcopus is Latin for "bishop". The current genus Thraupis was introduced by the German naturalist Friedrich Boie in 1826.

There are 14 recognized subspecies, differing according to the exact hue of blue of the shoulder patch versus the rest of the plumage; they may be greyish, greenish or purplish-blue, with a lavender, dark blue or whitish shoulder patch. For example, T. e. berlepschi (endemic to Tobago) is a brighter and darker blue on the rump and shoulder, T. e. neosophilus with a violet shoulder patch occurs in northern Venezuela, Trinidad, eastern Colombia and the far north of Brazil, T. e. mediana of the southern Amazon basin has a white wing patch, and T. e. cana in the northern Amazon has blue shoulders.

Description
Adults have a light bluish head and underparts, with darker blue upperparts and a shoulder patch colored a different hue of blue. The bill is short and quite thick. Sexes are similar, but the immature is much duller in plumage.

The song is a squeaky twittering, interspersed with tseee and tsuup call notes.

Breeding and habitat
The breeding habitat is open woodland, cultivated areas and gardens. The blue-gray tanager lives mainly on fruit, but will also take some nectar and insects. This is a common, restless, noisy and confiding species, usually found in pairs, but sometimes small groups. It thrives around human habitation, and will take some cultivated fruit like papayas (Carica papaya).

One to three, usually two, dark-marked whitish to gray-green eggs are laid in a deep cup nest in a high tree fork or building crevice. Incubation by the female is 14 days with another 17 to fledging. The nest is sometimes parasitised by Molothrus cowbirds.

Two birds studied in the Parque Nacional de La Macarena of Colombia were infected with microfilariae, an undetermined Trypanosoma species, and another blood parasite that could not be identified. Two other birds, examined near Turbo (also in Colombia), did not have blood parasites.

Agricultural ecology
T. episcopus prospers in some areas cleared by humans for grazing, but is not as attracted to buildings or high human or livestock activity. They continue to live in forests but eagerly move temporarily into abandoned pasture land for wild fruits and have been variously found to never forage or merely to forage less often in pasture that has livestock in it. T. episcopus is more common in secondary forest resulting from slash-and-burn followed by abandonment than in primary forest.

T. episcopus is commonly infected with Blastocystis parasites, specifically Subtype 6 (ST6) which was exclusive to birds in that area. ST6 was never found in cows in the area, but it was unassessed whether T. episcopus shares ST6 with nearby domesticated bird flocks.

Status
Widespread and common throughout its large range, the blue-gray tanager is evaluated as Least Concern on the IUCN Red List of Threatened Species.

Gallery

References

Further reading

External links

 
 
 Stamps from Belize, Panama, Suriname at bird-stamps.org
 Photo at stevenrotsch.com
 
 
 
 
 

blue-gray tanager
Birds of Central America
Birds of Colombia
Birds of Venezuela
Birds of Ecuador
Birds of Trinidad and Tobago
Birds of the Guianas
Birds of the Amazon Basin
Birds of Peru
blue-gray tanager
blue-gray tanager
Birds of Brazil
Birds of the Caribbean
Taxobox binomials not recognized by IUCN